Amparo Guillén is an Ecuadorian actress. Her best-known role was as Lupita, the mother of the Vera household in the Ecuadorian sitcom .

Biography
Guillén took an interest in singing and acting from a young age and at 23 began her career in the field by joining a theater group. She debuted as a television actress in the Ecuavisa telenovela Por amor propio.

Mis adorables entenados
The next year, Ecuavisa brought the production to television and Guillén played the mother of the eponymous Vera family, who struggled to raise her step-children. Guillén participated in the series's entire run, 1989 to 1991. In 2016, she had reunions with the rest of the cast in Ecuador and the United States.

Personal life
Amparo Guillén was sexually assaulted at ages six and fourteen, causing her to fall into substance abuse for the next 21 years of her life. Guillén kept her addiction secret, but reached a crisis when she sent her daughter, then nine years old, to study in the United States. She sought help and, at age 41, defeated her addiction and now speaks publicly to young people about the dangers of substance abuse.

Citations

Living people
Date of birth missing (living people)
Place of birth missing (living people)
Ecuadorian television actresses
Ecuadorian stage actresses
Year of birth missing (living people)
21st-century Ecuadorian women